Najwaniwala is a town of Bahawalpur District in the Punjab province of eastern Pakistan. Neighbouring settlements included Faqirwali and Dadwala.

Populated places in Bahawalpur District